NMOS (or nMOS) can refer to:

 NMOS logic
 n-channel MOSFET